The Ministry of Information and Broadcasting of India confers Bharatendu Harishchandra Awards to encourage original and creative writing in Hindi. The program began in 1983.

References

External links 
Ministry of Information and Broadcasting Annual Report 2000-2001. p 47.

Indian awards
Indian journalism awards
1983 establishments in India